In 2005–06 season Associazione Calcio Milan had a rather modest season compared to its previous seasons, before being rocked by a minor involvement in the 2006 Italian football scandal, where rivals Juventus was relegated and stripped of two league titles. Due to Milan's involvement, it did not inherit either of the titles, instead being penalised and dropped down the 2006 order, initially out of European football but later reinstated into fourth, which meant UEFA Champions League qualification, a tournament Milan then went on to win. However, Milan started the 2006–07 Serie A season with an eight-point deduction, which complicated hopes of a new league title.

On the pitch, Milan was not able to challenge Juventus for the virtual league title, then going out against Barcelona in the Champions League.

Following the season, the club sold Andriy Shevchenko for €40 million, the highest fee paid for a player turning 30 in the same year, to English club Chelsea.

Players

Squad information
Squad at end of season

Left club during season

Reserve squad

Competitions

Serie A

League table

Results summary

Results by round

Matches

Coppa Italia

Round of 16

Quarter-finals

UEFA Champions League

Group stage

Knockout phase

Round of 16

Quarter-finals

Semi-finals

Statistics

Appearances and goals
As of 30 June 2006

Top scorers

Serie A
  Andriy Shevchenko 19 (5 pen.)
  Alberto Gilardino 17 (1 pen.)
  Kaká 14 (3 pen.)
  Filippo Inzaghi 12
  Clarence Seedorf 4

References

A.C. Milan seasons
Milan